Eric Oteyza de Guia (born October 3, 1942), better known as Kidlat Tahimik ("Silent Lightning"), is a film director, writer and actor whose films are commonly associated with the Third Cinema movement through their critiques of neocolonialism. For his contributions to the development of Philippine independent cinema, he was recognized in 2018 as a National Artist of the Philippines for Film - a conferment which represents the Philippine state's highest recognition for artists.

One of the most prominent names in the Filipino film industry, he has garnered various accolades locally and internationally, including a Plaridel honorarium for independent cinema. He is dubbed by fellow filmmakers and critics as the "Father of Philippine Independent Cinema".

In recent years, Tahimik has become a noted installation artist with his works exhibited in various public spaces in the Philippines.

Education
Tahimik attended the University of the Philippines Diliman, where he was elected President of the UP Student Council, then known as the University Student Union, from 1962 to 1963. While attending the university he became a member of the Upsilon Sigma Phi fraternity. Tahimik studied at the University of Pennsylvania's Wharton School, earning a Master in Business Administration. Upon his return, he founded AIESEC in the Philippines.

He worked as a researcher for the Organisation for Economic Co-operation and Development (OECD) in Paris from 1968 to 1972.

Influences
Tahimik grew up in Baguio, Philippines, a summer resort community established in the presence of several U.S. Military bases. This experience influenced the themes of his films, most notably the semi-autobiographical Perfumed Nightmare (1977) and Turumba (1983).

The latter of these two films provides some insight into the circumstances that brought him to Europe and into the presence of filmmaker Werner Herzog, who along with director Francis Ford Coppola and his American Zoetrope studio, was instrumental in helping to release Perfumed Nightmare in the United States.

Personal life
Kidlat's wife is German artist and writer Katrin De Guia. They had three children: Kidlat de Guia (or Kidlat Gottlieb Kalayaan); Kawayan Thor Kalayaan; and Kabunian De Guia (or Kabunian Cedric Enrique).

In February 2004, a fire was reported to have spread in their home 4-storey home in Benguet, the Philippines. The family was able to escape safely, but the director's film stock and collection of art and artifacts were destroyed.

He owns the vegetarian cafe Oh My Gulay located at the top of the La Azotea building in Baguio, Philippines and he also owns and maintains the Ili-Likha Artist's Village which is also in Baguio.

Filmography

Director

Feature films
Perfumed Nightmare (1977)
Who Invented the Yoyo? Who Invented the Moon Buggy? (1982)
Turumba (1983)
Takedera Mon Amour: Diary of a Bamboo Connection (1991)
Why Is Yellow the Middle of the Rainbow? (with Kidlat Gottlieb Kalayaan; also known as I Am Furious... Yellow, 1989 and 1994)
BalikBayan #1: Memories of Overdevelopment (Redux III, 2015; Redux VI, 2017)
Lakbayan (segment: "Kabayan’s Journey to Liwanang", 2018)

Short films
The films listed here are less than 50 minutes in length:
Yan Ki Made in Hong Kong (1980)
Orbit 50: Letters to My 3 Sons (1992)
Celebrating the Year 2021, Today (1995)
Japanese Summers of a Filipino Fundoshi (1996)
Banal Kahoy (Holy Wood) (2000)
Aqua Planet (2003)
Some More Rice (2005)
Our Film – Grimage to Guimaras (2006)
BUBONG! Roofs of the World! Unite! (2006)
Ang Balikbayan: Memories of Overdevelopment 1980–2010 (2010)

Television film
Olympisches Gold (from Vater Unser, 1981)

Writer
Perfumed Nightmare (1977)
Turumba (1983)
Why Is Yellow the Middle of the Rainbow? (1994)
BalikBayan #1: Memories of Overdevelopment (2015; 2017)

Producer
Perfumed Nightmare (1977)
Turumba (1983)
Abong: Small Home (2003)

Actor
The Enigma of Kaspar Hauser (1974)
Perfumed Nightmare (1977)
Jag rodnar (I Am Blushing, 1981)
Smaragd (1987)
José Rizal (1998)
Abong: Small Home (2003)
BalikBayan #1: Memories of Overdevelopment (2015; 2017)

Awards and honors

Awards
27th Berlin International Film Festival International Critics Award: Perfumed Nightmare (1977)
Mannheim Film Festival Top Cash Award: Turumba (1981)
Fukuoka Asian Culture Prize Laureate, Arts and Culture Prize (2012)
Berlin Film Festival Caligari Award: Balikbayan #1 Memories of Overdevelopment Redux III (2015)
Prince Claus Laureate (2018)

National honours
National Artist of the Philippines (Film and Broadcast Arts) (2018)

Honorary degree
 University of the Cordilleras – Doctor of Humanities (August 24, 2018)

References

External links
Website of first complete Kidlat Tahimik retrospective in Berlin 2016

The Philippine Movie Database: Kidlat Tahimik
Homegrown: Kidlat Tahimik 
Interview with Tahimik on eRenlai.com
The-Artists.org: Kidlat Tahimik
American Zoetrope Films
2010 Taiwan International Documentary Festival Focus Director
Laureates, 2012 Fukuoka Asian Culture Prizes
A story and short documentary about Kidlat Tahimik

1942 births
Living people
Filipino film directors
Filipino male film actors
Filipino screenwriters
National Artists of the Philippines
People from Baguio
People from Ifugao
University of the Philippines alumni
Wharton School of the University of Pennsylvania alumni
Filipino film producers
Filipino television directors